Beckerich is a commune and small town in western Luxembourg, in the canton of Redange. It lies close to the border with Belgium.

, the town of Beckerich, which lies in the centre of the commune, has a population of 635.

Beckerich has a drinking water production plant, which supplies Lidl Stores with water internationally.  It supplies about 85% of its energy needs, exclusive of transportation, from alternative energy sources, primarily manure.

Populated places
The commune consists of the following villages:

 Beckerich Section:
 Beckerich
 Elvange
 Hovelange
 Huttange
 Noerdange
 Schweich
 Hovelangerhof (lieu-dit)
 Liederreng (lieu-dit)
 Liederrengerhof (lieu-dit)

 Oberpallen Section:
 Dideling
 Levelange
 Oberpallen

Population

References

External links
 

 
Communes in Redange (canton)
Towns in Luxembourg